Ahhotep I (alternatively Anglicized Ahhotpe or Aahhotep, "Iah (the Moon) is satisfied") was an ancient Egyptian queen who lived circa 1560–1530 BC, during the end of the Seventeenth Dynasty of Egypt. She was the daughter of Queen Tetisheri (known as Teti the Small) and Senakhtenre Ahmose, and was probably the sister, as well as the queen consort, of Pharaoh Seqenenre Tao ll. Ahhotep I had a long and influential life. She ruled as regent for her son Ahmose I for a time.

Her titles include Great Royal Wife and "Associate of the White Crown Bearer". The title "King's Mother" was found on the Deir el-Bahari coffin.

Different Ahhoteps
The naming and numbering of the queens named Ahhotep has changed during the years. Outlining the different naming and numbering conventions over the years:

Late 19th century: Ahhotep I was thought to be the wife of Seqenenre Tao. The coffins of Deir el-Bahari and Dra' Abu el-Naga' were both thought to be hers by some experts. Ahhotep II was thought to be the wife of Amenhotep I. Some thought the coffin from the Deir el-Bahari cache belonged to the queen called Ahhotep II in this scheme.

Late 20th century: In the 1970s, it was commented on that the Deir el-Bahari coffin bears the title "King's Mother" and Amenhotep I has no son. The title must refer to the mother of Ahmose I. In 1982, Robins suggests that Ahhotep I is the owner of the gilded coffin from Dra' Abu el-Naga', Ahhotep II is the queen mentioned on the Deir el-Bahari coffin and Ahhotep III is the queen mentioned on the statue of a prince Ahmose.

Present 21st century: Following Dodson and Hilton (2004), Ahhotep I is the wife of Seqenenre Tao and mother of Ahmose I. Ahhotep II is the queen known from the gilded coffin found at Dra' Abu el-Naga' and possibly a wife of Kamose. (There is no Ahhotep III). Taneash Sidpura, mainly on the basis of the King's Daughters Satkamose and Satdjehuty, concluded that there was only one Ahhotep at this time.

Family
Ahhotep I was the daughter of Queen Tetisheri and Pharaoh Senakhtenre Ahmose. She was the royal wife of the seventeenth dynasty king Seqenenre Tao; he is believed to have been her brother.

Ahhotep was probably the mother of Pharaoh Ahmose I. Her exact relationship to Pharaoh Kamose is not known, but he may have been her brother-in-law (the brother of Seqenenre Tao) or her son. Other children of Queen Ahhotep I include the later Queen Ahmose-Nefertari, who was married to her brother, Pharaoh Ahmose I. There were also Prince Ahmose Sapair, Prince Binpu, Princess Ahmose-Henutemipet, Princess Ahmose-Nebetta, and Princess Ahmose-Tumerisy.

Life
A stela from the reign of Ahmose I describes Ahhotep I as ruling Egypt and uniting its people, attributes that are normally only reserved for kings. It is not known when these events took place but presumably after the death of Seqenenre Tao and Kamose, when Ahmose I was too young to rule. 

Ahhotep is mentioned on the Kares stela (CG 34003) which dates to year 10 of Amenhotep I, and her steward Iuf mentions her on his stela (CG 34009). Iuf refers to Ahhotep as the mother of Ahmose I, and would later be the steward of Queen Ahmose, wife of Thutmose I. This suggests Ahhotep I may have died at a fairly advanced age during the reign of Thutmose I.

Tomb
Ahhotep I's outer coffin was eventually reburied in TT320 in Deir el Bahari. The coffin shows the queen with a tripartite wig and a  modius. The body is covered in a rishi-design (feathers) and is similar to the outer coffins of Ahmose-Nefertari and Ahmose-Meritamon.

Ahhotep I's original tomb is not known, unless this queen is identical to Ahhotep II. Measurements of the coffin found in Dra' Abu el-Naga' however show that it is too large to have belonged with the Deir el Bahari coffin. This has been used to argue that Ahhotep I cannot be identical to Ahhotep II.

Alternative theory
An alternative interpretation has been developed by Ann Macy Roth. This suggests that Seqenenre Tao had three queens:
 Ahhotep I, who was the mother of a Prince Ahmose (not the future pharaoh) and several princesses named Ahmes.
 Sitdjehuti, who was the mother of a princess named Ahmes.
 Tetisheri, who was the mother of Kamose, Ahhotep II and Ahmose-Henuttamehu.

In this interpretation, Kamose married his sister Ahhotep II and then were the parents of Ahmose I, Ahmose-Nefertari and Ahmose-Sitkamose.

References

 Sidpura, Taneash. 2015 Proceedings of the Second Birmingham Egyptology Symposium, 2015. Pages 21-46
 Eaton-Krauss, Marianne. 2003. "Encore: The Coffins of Ahhotep, the wife of Seqeni-en-Re Tao and mother of Ahmose". Pages 75–89 in E. Graefe and other editors. Ägypten-Münster. Otto Harrassowitz.

External links

Hatshepsut: from Queen to Pharaoh, an exhibition catalog from The Metropolitan Museum of Art (fully available online as PDF), which contains material on Ahhotep I (see index)
AEGEAN LB I-II POTTERY IN THE EAST: ‘WHO IS THE POTTER, PRAY, AND WHO THE POT?’, Hankey and Leonard

Queens consort of the Seventeenth Dynasty of Egypt
Ancient Egyptian women in warfare
16th-century BC clergy
16th-century BC women rulers
Egyptian military leaders
Regents of Egypt